Securax (1998–2002) was considered as one of Belgium's strongest hacking movements in the past twenty years and was founded by Filip Maertens and co-founded by Davy Van De Moere as an online community in order to combine skills and experiences in the domain of vulnerability identification, zero-day exploit creation and penetration testing methods. The movement was known for its critical insights into the information security industry, bold press interviews and its near-daily newsletter (in Dutch).

At its peak, the newsletter was read by over 90,000 Dutch-speaking readers,  both professionals and non-professionals. As of September 1999, companies could make use of the knowledge by way of "legal intrusion tests", where Securax assembled high quality and very skilled Tiger Teams to perform the projects.  It was as of May 2000 that Securax made the choice to walk the thin line between attaining a community of security experts and hackers, while offering commercial services at enterprise level. In 2002 the community was disbanded.

References

Hacker groups